The 1946–47 season was the 67th season of competitive football by Rangers.

Overview
Rangers played a total of 43 competitive matches during the 1946–47 season. This was the first official season played since the end of the Second World War. The club played in the Scottish League Division A and won the championship (25th title) with 46 points. They scored 76 goals during the campaign and conceded only 26 in the 30 matches. Willie Thornton finished top scorer with 19 goals.

Rangers were successful in the newly inaugurated League Cup.They won all six matches in their Section before overcoming Dundee United from Division B in a 2 leg Quarter-Final. Hibernian were beaten 3–1 in the Semi-Final in front of a crowd of 125,154. Rangers defeated Aberdeen 4–0 in the Final at Hampden Park with Jimmy Duncanson netting a brace.

The Scottish Cup campaign ended at the Second Round stage. The club were knocked out in a replay by Hibernian at Easter Road.[1]

Jock Shaw, Willie Waddell and Willie Thornton represented Scotland against England in a match in aid of the Burnden Park Disaster victims.

Transfers 
6 August 1946:
Charlie Johnstone to Queen of the South.
John Galloway to Chelsea.

1 May 1947:
Dougie Gray and Jimmy Smith were given free transfers.

Results
All results are written with Rangers' score first.

Scottish League Division A

Scottish Cup

League Cup

Appearances

See also
 1946–47 in Scottish football
 1946–47 Scottish Cup
 1946–47 Scottish League Cup

References 

1. David Docherty, The Rangers Companion, 

Rangers F.C. seasons
Rangers
Scottish football championship-winning seasons